Padmanabhapuram division is a revenue division in the Kanyakumari district of Tamil Nadu, India. Sharanya Ari is the current Sub Collector Serving here.

References 

 

Kanyakumari district